Rocky VI is a 1986 nine-minute black-and-white short parody of Rocky IV by Finnish director Aki Kaurismäki. The film stars Antti Juhani "Silu" Seppälä (Leningrad Cowboys) as Rocky and Sakari Kuosmanen as Igor, his Soviet opponent. In the film, the two boxers fight at Töölö Sports Hall in Helsinki. The much bigger Igor quickly knocks out Rocky and wins the match.

Rocky VI is still shown at many film festivals. In 2004, the film was screened at Finále Plzeň in Czech Republic and at Xèntric at the Center of Contemporary Culture of Barcelona in Spain. In 2007, the film was screened at Tampere Film Festival as part of a Kaurismäki retrospective.

In the title, the letter VI does not actually represent number six, but an inverted IV, of Rocky IV, the specific film parodied. The fifth film in the Rocky series, Rocky V, was released almost four years after this parody. The sixth Rocky film, Rocky Balboa, was released 20 years after Rocky VI.

See also
 Ricky 1, a 1988 low budget, feature-length parody of Rocky.

References

External links
 
 Rocky VI at Allmovie

1986 films
Films directed by Aki Kaurismäki
1980s parody films
1986 short films
Rocky (film series)
1980s sports films
1986 comedy films
1980s American films